The 1980 Fuji Long Distance Series was the fourth season of this series, with all races being held at the Fuji International Speedway.

It was contested by Group 5 silhouettes and touring cars; Group 6 sportscars were allowed to start races without scoring points.

Schedule

Season results

Final standings

References

Fuji Long Distance Series seasons